Lemniscia michaudi is a species of air-breathing land snails, terrestrial pulmonate gastropod mollusks in the family Hygromiidae, the hairy snails and their allies.

This species is endemic to Porto Santo Island, Portugal. Its natural habitat is temperate grassland. It is threatened by habitat loss.

References

Endemic fauna of Madeira
Molluscs of Europe
Lemniscia
Gastropods described in 1830
Taxonomy articles created by Polbot